Brentwood School is a selective, independent day and boarding school in Brentwood, Essex, England in the public school tradition. The school comprises a preparatory school, senior school and sixth form, as well as boarding provision for both boys and girls. The school is coeducational, and employs the "Diamond Model". The school is a member of the Headmasters' and Headmistresses' Conference, the IAPS, and the AGBIS. 

Founded in 1557 and opened in 1558, the school has a Tudor schoolroom, a Victorian chapel and several Grade II listed buildings. The current headmaster is Michael Bond.

History

16th–18th century
 
The licence to found the school as The Grammar School of Antony Browne, Serjeant at the Law, in Brentwood was granted by Queen Mary I to Sir Antony (or Anthony) Browne on 5 July 1558. The first schoolmaster, George Otway, was appointed on 28 July 1558.

In 1568, a year after Browne's death, the school moved to a purpose-built schoolroom, which is extant. The commemoration stone was laid by Browne's stepdaughter, Dorothy Huddleston, and her husband Edward, Browne's marriage having been childless.

The school room is beside the site of the execution of nineteen-year-old William Hunter, who was burned at the stake for denying the doctrine of transubstantiation. The Martyr's Elm grew, allegedly, on the spot of his immolation. It was Browne who, as a Justice of the Peace under Queen Mary, had sentenced Hunter. Some believe the school was founded as Browne's penance for Hunter's martyrdom when Queen Elizabeth I came to the throne; however, the school was already in operation under Mary's licence when Elizabeth succeeded.

Although Browne had drawn up statutes for the school, they were never legally adopted and so were re-drawn in 1622 by his descendants and John Donne, Dean of St Paul's.

19th century

Brentwood School Combined Cadet Force (CCF) was founded in 1861 and so is one of the earliest CCFs in the country.

20th century

Sixty Old Brentwoods were killed on active service during the First World War and 173 during the Second World War. Their names are listed in the school chapel, and commemorated by the Memorial Hall for the first war and the pavilion for the second. The school was a direct grant grammar school from the 1960s until the abolition of the scheme in 1977.

Brentwood was originally a boys' school, but the Governors made the decision to allow a small number of girls to enter the sixth form in 1974. By the early 1980s there were 23 girls in the sixth form. Initially based in Newnum House, the girls' school opened in 1988, admitting girls from ages 11 to 18.

21st century
In 2007, Brentwood School celebrated its 450th anniversary with a commemorative service in St Paul's Cathedral.

The school's Combined Cadet Force (CCF) celebrated its 150th anniversary on 8 October 2011 by holding a special afternoon of events featuring a Guard of Honour by Lt General Brown CBE. The Royal British Legion Youth Band of Brentwood played at the start and end of the afternoon.

In 2012, The Earl of Wessex visited the school to open the new sixth form centre, featuring a 400-seat auditorium, named The Wessex Auditorium in his honour.

In 2016, work finished on a new academic centre in the heart of the School, named the Bean Academic Centre after former Headmaster Edwin Bean, quadrupling the size of the original library.

In 2020, work finished on a major expansion and redevelopment of the Preparatory School facilities, to include a new hall and dining facilities, modernised administrative offices and a new classroom block with fully-equipped cooking and art studios, and a futures room.

School arms

The arms of Brentwood School are derived from those of the founder, Sir Antony Browne, and his wife.

As part of the commemoration of the 400th anniversary of the school's founding, a special variant of Sir Antony Browne's Coat of Arms was granted by the Honourable Sir George Rothe Bellew, Garter Principal King of Arms and Sir John Dunamace Heaton-Armstrong, Clarenceux King of Arms on 19 July 1957. A red border was added to the arms to distinguish them as the school's, as opposed to those of Browne.

The school today

Academic
The school is separated into three sections: the preparatory school (ages 3 to 11), the senior school (ages 11 to 16) and the sixth form (ages 16 to 18). Brentwood operates in a diamond school format, in which the preparatory school and sixth form are co-educational while the senior school teaches boys and girls separately.

Brentwood Preparatory School teaches children aged 3–11, from Nursery through to Year 6. Classes are usually small, with an average size of 20 per class. The prep school follows the National Curriculum but teaches some supplementary subjects such as French and Latin. There is also a broad extracurricular programme, which all pupils are encouraged to follow, featuring dance, drama and music, as well as sports such as hockey and golf.

The senior school teaches pupils from the age of 11 until the end of GCSE courses at 16+. Many pupils move into the senior school from the preparatory school, but others are drawn from other local primary and preparatory schools; around 1/3 of pupils join the school from the maintained sector. Admission to the senior school is by entrance examination. In addition to core subjects (English, mathematics, sciences, MFL), pupils' GCSE and IGCSE options include computer science, drama, DT, food technology, geography, Greek, history, Latin, music, RS

The sixth form is for pupils aged 1618 who are studying for 'A' levels, the International Baccalaureate and BTec Extended Diploma in Sport or Business. There are currently c.300 pupils in the sixth form. 'A' level options include classics, computer science, DT, economics, English literature, history, mathematics and MFL.

Sport
Sports offered include Association football, cricket, fencing, gymnastics, hockey, netball, rifle shooting, Rugby football, squash, swimming and tennis. School teams have met with some success over the years, for example winning the Essex Schools FA Cup three times in four seasons. In netball, the girls' U13 netball team won the 2015/6 national finals to be crowned National Champions.

The school has a 25-metre indoor swimming-pool and learner pool, a fitness suite, 4 additional squash courts and an indoor rifle range. These contain football, rugby, cricket and hockey pitches, an all-weather AstroTurf pitch, tennis and netball courts, an athletics track and field, and woods used for cross-country runs.

Ex-England test cricketer Geraint Jones is the school's cricket coach.

Drama and music
The school hosts various theatrical performances and shows. In any academic year the theatrical line-up will include a winter/spring play/musical, a sixth-form comedy charity show and a dance show. Recent shows have included My Fair Lady and Habeas Corpus, Les Misérables and West Side Story and into the Woods also. Every year the school holds inter-house music and drama competitions, often with guest adjudicators.

The school has a link with Brentwood (Roman Catholic) and Chelmsford (Anglican) cathedrals; a number of pupils and staff sing in the choir of each cathedral. The music department has 5 full-time teaching staff and 20 visiting teachers. A Sibelius suite is available in the school's music department for student and staff use. The School is one of only 14 Steinway Schools in the country, meaning that all performance and practice pianos are Steinways.

There is a symphony orchestra, brass and string ensembles, a junior choir, a choral society and a barbershop group. Recent choral performances have included Belshazzar's Feast (Walton), the Requiems of Mozart, Verdi and Fauré, and Gloria by Poulenc. The Brentwood School Big Band, which is now in its 34th year, often performs concerts for charity outside school and tours European every other year. The Big Band has released a number of albums, most recently "Music to Drive By" in 2013.

Model United Nations
Since 2013, Brentwood has hosted an annual Model United Nations (BREMUN) conference. In the past it has been a one-day conference, however since 2015 it lasted for two days. Students from schools across the south east attend and it has a capacity of approximately 200 students.

Sir Antony Browne Society (SABS)
SABS is a society that focuses on furthering the education of sixth formers through a series of guest speakers and debates. Junior SABS is available for the younger pupils. Regular meetings are held in Old Big School, at which students are able to experience lectures on societal issues or topics to concerning science, the arts and sport, or a members' debate. Old Brentwoods such as Jack Straw and Griff Rhys Jones are regular speakers. Other speakers have been political figures, such as George Galloway and Vicky Pryce, and the philosopher A. C. Grayling.

Royal visits and connections
The licence to found the school was granted by Queen Mary to Sir Antony Browne on 5 July 1558.  Her Majesty The Queen visited the school in 1957 to open the new science department, now named The Queens Building, the foundation stone of which had been laid by the Lord Lieutenant of Essex, Col. Sir Francis Whitmore.  The Earl of Wessex visited the school in 2011 for the opening ceremony of the new sixth form centre and the naming of the Wessex Auditorium, and later to inspect a Combined Cadet Force Guard of Honour.  Princess Anne visited the School in November 2012.

RIBA Award
In 2012, Brentwood School's sixth form centre was winner of the Royal Institute of British Architects (RIBA) East of England Award. The institute described the development as having drawn "inspiration from the existing Victorian vicarage" and that "the new design is expressed in a language that is both contextual and contemporary. The sculpting of the roofs creates non-standard, domestic-scaled classrooms filled with natural light, reminiscent of the gabled roofs of the Victorian vicarage, but with an added measure of playfulness."

Sexual abuse allegations
In 1997, Gareth Stafford-Bull, who taught fencing at the school (and was also an under-20s coach for the England fencing team), went missing and was sacked by the school in his absence following allegations that he had indecently assaulted pupils. The 41-year-old was later found dead in his car at Brighton.

Notable former pupils

Old Brentwoods are those who have attended the school (preparatory, senior school or sixth form) for any length of time. The logo used to represent Old Brentwoods and the Society of Old Brentwoods is the wing and claw, derived from the arms of Sir Antony Browne. A crown was added to the logo in 1957 to celebrate The Queen's visit to the school.

The colours of Old Brentwoods are dark blue, light blue and gold. Light blue and dark blue were traditionally featured as stripes on the blazers of Old Brentwoods and are still used today to represent the alumni community. The colours were carried across to the alumni logo, with the addition of gold on the inclusion of the crown in 1957.

Old Brentwoods

Also see the school's own list of Old Brentwoods.

David Acfield (born 1947), cricketer and Olympic fencer
Douglas Adams (1952–2001), author of The Hitchhiker's Guide to the Galaxy
Keith Allen (born 1953), comedian, actor, singer and writer (father of the singer Lily Allen)
Peter Allen (born 1946), BBC broadcaster and journalist,
Sir Hardy Amies (1909–2003), Couturier and Dressmaker by Appointment to Her Majesty The Queen
Peter Barker (born 1983), squash player and influential member of winning English team in European Team Championships 2006
Charles Bean (1879–1963), historian of Australian Forces in World War I.
Charlie Bean (born 1953), Executive Director and Chief Economist of the Bank of England
Lilian Bennett (1922-2013) businesswoman, and the chairman and chief executive of Manpower UK - attended whilst it was only a boys' school
Guy Black, Baron Black of Brentwood (born 1964), former Press Secretary to Michael Howard, and Director of PCC
George Cansdale (1909–1993), zoologist and broadcaster
Patrick Carter, Baron Carter of Coles (born 1946), politician and life peer
Colonel Sir Neville Chamberlain (1856–1944), army officer, Inspector-General of the Royal Irish Constabulary and inventor of snooker
Roger Cowley (born 1939), professor of experimental philosophy at the University of Oxford
Sir Robin Day (1923–2000), broadcaster (attended the school 1934–1938)
George Dobson (born 1997), association footballer currently on loan at from Sunderland at AFC Wimbledon as of 2021
Sir David Eady (born 1943), High Court Judge
David Eldridge (born 1973), playwright
Noel Edmonds (born 1948), disc jockey and broadcaster
Stephen Fleet (1936–2006), Master of Downing College, Cambridge
Howard Flight (born 1948), Conservative politician
Sir Roderick Floud (born 1942), academic, Vice-President of the European Universities Association
Fabian Hamilton (born 1955), Labour politician
Neil Harris (born 1977), association footballer
Edward "Eddie" Hearn (born 1979), sports promoter
Keith Hopkins (1934–2004), influential historian and sociologist, Professor of Ancient History at the University of Cambridge
David Irving (born 1938), writer and Holocaust denier
Chris Jarvis (born 1969), television presenter
Paul Neil Milne Johnstone (1952–2004) poet and butt of Douglas Adams' jokes in The Hitchhiker's Guide to the Galaxy
Nic Jones (born 1947), musician
Frank Lampard OBE (born 1978), association footballer capped 106 times by England scoring 29 goals for his country and former manager of Derby County and Chelsea FC
Andrew Lansley (born 1956), Conservative politician, former Leader of the House of Commons 2012–2014 and former Secretary of State for Health, current member of the House of Lords
Elliot Lee (born 1994), association footballer
Olly Lee (born 1991), association footballer
Frank Godbould Lee (1903–1971), civil servant and Master of Corpus Christi College, University of Cambridge
Sir Ralph Murray (1908–1983), diplomat
Jodie Marsh (born 1978), glamour model
Ian Martin (born 1948), Special Representative of the Secretary General of the UN & Secretary-General of Amnesty International
 Derek Martinus, TV director
Jake Maskall (born 1971), actor
Robert Andrew Muter Macindoe Ogilvie (1853–1938), England international association footballer
Hal Ozsan (born 1976), actor
Nigel Paterson (musician) (born 1947), guitarist, educator, composer
Michael Peppiatt (born 1941), writer and art historian
Eric Peters (born 1969), rugby player
Ian Pont (born 1961), professional cricketer, international coach and author
Penny Rimbaud (born Jeremy Ratter 1943), drummer, poet and founder of punk band Crass
Griff Rhys Jones (born 1953), comedian and actor
Stewart Robson (born 1964), association footballer
Sir John Rogers (1928), Air Chief Marshal in the Royal Air Force and member of the FIA World Motor Sport Council
Vivian Rosewarne (1917 – May 1940) Wellington bomber pilot memorialised in the 1941 film An Airman's Letter to His Mother
Duncan Sanderson (born 1948), musician
Sir Nick Scheele (born 1944), former President of the Ford Motor Company
Daryl Selby (born 1982), professional squash player
Asad Shan model and actor
Bob Simpson (1944–2006), BBC journalist
Sir Peter Stothard (born 1951), former editor of The Times
Jack Straw (born 1946), Labour politician, Lord High Chancellor of Great Britain 2007–2010
Charles Thomson (born 1953), founder of the Stuckists art movement
Michael Francis Tompsett (born 1939), inventor of CCD imagers
Paul Wickens (born 1956) musician, usually known as "Wix", for many years, Paul McCartney's musical director on tour. 
Teerathep Winothai (born 1985), Thai footballer
Sir Denis Wright (1911–2005) ambassador and author
Stephen Yardley (born 1942), actor

References

External links

 Official School Site
 Old Brentwoods Official Alumni Portal
 Society of Old Brentwoods
 The Brentwood School Big Band

Educational institutions established in the 1550s
Private schools in Essex
Brentwood (Essex town)
1558 establishments in England
Member schools of the Headmasters' and Headmistresses' Conference
International Baccalaureate schools in England
Boarding schools in Essex
Diamond schools
Schools with a royal charter